Jacob Bruun Larsen  (born 19 September 1998) is a Danish professional footballer who plays as a winger for Bundesliga club 1899 Hoffenheim and the Denmark national team. He competed at the 2016 Summer Olympics.

Club career

Borussia Dortmund
In 2015, Bruun Larsen signed for Borussia Dortmund from Lyngby. On 15 March 2017, the club announced the extension of his contract until 2021.

On 23 January 2018, Bruun Larsen joined VfB Stuttgart on a half-season loan deal.

He scored his first goal for Borussia Dortmund in a 7–0 victory over 1. FC Nürnberg on 27 September 2018.

1899 Hoffenheim
On 31 January 2020, 1899 Hoffenheim announced the signing of Bruun Larsen on a four-and-a-half year deal.

Bruun Larsen signed for Belgian club RSC Anderlecht on 23 January 2021. He agreed to a loan until the end of the season.

International career
Bruun Larsen was chosen to represent Denmark at the Olympics in Rio de Janeiro.

He made his debut for the senior Denmark national football team on 21 March 2019 in a friendly against Kosovo, as a starter.

Career statistics

Club

International goals

Scores and results list Denmark's goal tally first, score column indicates score after each Bruun Larsen goal.

Honours
Borussia Dortmund U19

 Under 19 Bundesliga: 2015–16, 2016–17

Borussia Dortmund

 DFB-Pokal: 2016–17
 DFL-Supercup: 2019

Individual
UEFA European Under-21 Championship Team of the Tournament: 2021

References

External links 

1998 births
Living people
People from Kongens Lyngby
Sportspeople from the Capital Region of Denmark
Danish men's footballers
Association football wingers
Borussia Dortmund players
VfB Stuttgart players
TSG 1899 Hoffenheim players
R.S.C. Anderlecht players
Bundesliga players
Belgian Pro League players
Denmark youth international footballers
Denmark under-21 international footballers
Denmark international footballers
Olympic footballers of Denmark
Footballers at the 2016 Summer Olympics
Danish expatriate men's footballers
Expatriate footballers in Germany
Expatriate footballers in Belgium
Danish expatriate sportspeople in Germany
Danish expatriate sportspeople in Belgium